William (Bill) N.  Grannell (born January 6, 1938), is a former American politician and member of the Oregon House of Representatives. He is a former newspaper publisher for the Coos Bay Empire Builder and junior high school teacher.

References

1938 births
Living people
Democratic Party members of the Oregon House of Representatives
Politicians from Denver
People from Tillamook County, Oregon
Educators from Oregon